Brendon Thomas Christopher Ormsby (born 1 October 1960) is an English former professional footballer who played as a centre back for Aston Villa, Leeds United, Shrewsbury, Doncaster, Waterford United, Scarborough and Wigan. Ormsby was a product of the Aston Villa Academy and spent most of his professional career at the club.

Ormsby led Leeds to the FA Cup semi-final and Division Two play-offs in 1986–87. He worked as a postman in Leeds Moortown after retiring from football.

During his later years he has worked as a coach at Senior and Junior levels, including a spell working with Lawnswood Lasers JFC.

Ormsby is also the honorary president of the Scarborough Branch of the Leeds United Member's Club. He attends the club's annual 'On The Road' evening and his role has led to a beer being named after him. Ormsby's Bitter is brewed by the Wold Top brewery and can be sampled at the Spa Complex on the town's sea front.  Between 2000 and 2012, he worked for the Press Association, providing live by the second actions from Leeds United, Bradford City and Manchester City as part of the Football Live Project, these details were used to supply all major sports media outlets, including BBC & Sky Sports Vidiprinter.

Ormsby served as First Team Manager at Pontefract Collieries between 2012 and 2014, finishing fifth in each season.

Honours
Individual
PFA Team of the Year: 1990–91 Fourth Division

References

External links

The Brendon Ormsby Strike Back Fund

1960 births
Living people
Footballers from Birmingham, West Midlands
English footballers
Association football defenders
Aston Villa F.C. players
Leeds United F.C. players
Shrewsbury Town F.C. players
Doncaster Rovers F.C. players
Scarborough F.C. players
Waterford F.C. players
Wigan Athletic F.C. players
Garforth Town A.F.C. players
English Football League players
League of Ireland players
English football managers
Waterford F.C. managers
Pontefract Collieries F.C. managers
League of Ireland managers